The Phoenix Ghost is a small aerial loitering munition (explosive drone) designed by American company Aevex Aerospace. According to a senior US defense official, it is broadly similar to the AeroVironment Switchblade.

Capabilities 
The Phoenix Ghost's primary purpose is to deliver an explosive munition to a human-selected target. The drone can loiter over an area for up to six hours, and can conduct surveillance. It is effective against medium-armored ground targets. It has infrared sensors for night operations.

History 
In April 2022, the United States Department of Defense stated that the Phoenix Ghost was developed before the 2022 Russian invasion of Ukraine and that it was a "close match" for the needs of the Armed Forces of Ukraine in the Battle of Donbas. It was later revealed that the Phoenix Ghost was a project under the Big Safari weapons program.

After initially sending 120 in April, it was announced in July 2022 that another 580 Phoenix Ghosts would be delivered beginning the next month as part of the Ukraine Security Assistance Initiative (USAI). The Phoenix Ghost weapons were being provided to Ukraine via a new procurement by the United States, unlike the other weapons the US has provided to Ukraine in the early months following the invasion in February 2022. A U.S. aid package announced in November 2022 included more than 1,100 Phoenix Ghosts.

Operators

 United States Air Force
	
 Armed Forces of Ukraine (at least 120 systems delivered by early May 2022; with training also underway by May 2022) A further 1,100 were delivered as part of an aid package in early November.

References

Unmanned aerial vehicles of the United States
Loitering munition
Weapons and ammunition introduced in 2022